Nudorthodes is a genus of moths of the family Noctuidae erected by J. Donald Lafontaine, J. Bruce Walsh and Clifford D. Ferris in 2014.

Species
 Nudorthodes molino Lafontaine, Walsh & Ferris, 2014
 Nudorthodes texana (Smith, 1900)
 Nudorthodes variabilis (Barnes & McDunnough, 1912)

Etymology
The generic name refers to the fact that the species in the genus are removed from the other members of the Orthodes-group of genera by the lack of hairs on the surface of the eye. It is derived from Latin nudus (meaning bare) plus the genus name Orthodes.

References

Hadeninae